The following is a list of sporting events in India, listed by sport.

Aquatics 
1994: 8th Asian Pacific Age Group Swimming & Diving Championships
1995: 7th SAF Games
1999: 13th Asian  Pacific Age Group Swimming & Diving Championships

Athletics 
1992: 4th Asian Junior Athletic Championships,
1994: 7th IAAF International Permit Meet
1995:
South Asian Federation Games
ITC International Permit Meet
1996: 6th Asian Junior Athletic Championship
1997:
1st Raja Bhalendra Singh South Asian Athletic Meet
ITC International Meet
1998: 2nd Raja Bhalendra Singh International Athletic Meet
1999:
International Athletic Circuit Meet (I)
International Athletic Circuit Meet (II)
International Athletic Circuit Meet (III)
International Athletic Circuit Meet (IV)
AAFI Salwan International Meet
3rd Raja Bhalendra Singh International Athletic Meet
2000: 
International Athletic Circuit Meet
2nd International Athletic Circuit Meet
37th International Athletic Circuit Meet
2002, Asian Athletic Grand Prix
2010 Commonwealth Games

Boxing 
1995: YMCA International Boxing Championship
1996: Adajania Cup International Boxing Championship
1997: YMCA International Boxing Championships
1998: YMCA International Boxing Championships
1999: Adajania Cup International Boxing Championship
2002: YMCA Junior International Boxing Championship
2003:
YMCA Sr. Jr. & Sub-Jr. Int. Boxing Championship
2nd Asian Women's Boxing Championships, Scheduled
1st International Boxing Championship for Seniors, Scheduled
2004: YMCA International Boxing Championship

Cricket
1987: 1987 Cricket World Cup
1990-1991: 1990-91 Asia Cup
1996: 1996 Cricket World Cup
1997: 1997 Women's Cricket World Cup
1999: 1998-99 Asian Test Championship
2006: 2006 ICC Champions Trophy
2006: Women's Asia Cup
2011: 2011 Cricket World Cup
2013: 2013 Women's Cricket World Cup

Cycling 
1989: Asian Cycling Championships
2002: 2nd SAARC Cycling Championships

Gymnastics 
1998: SAF Games
2000: 1st Central South Asian Championships
2001: 1st SAARC International Gymnastic Championship Games

Hockey

Men's Hockey 
1995:
Indo-American Friendship Cup
Indira Gandhi Gold Cup
SAF Games
1996:
Four Nation Tournament for CM's Cup
Indira Gandhi Gold Cup
18th Kuber Champion Trophy

Hockey 
1996: India-Australia Test Series
1997: 
India-Poland Test Series
India-Germany Test Series
1998: India-Pakistan Test Series
2001:
India-Germany Test Series
India-Malaysia Test Series
2010:
Hockey world cup
2018:
2018 Men's Hockey World Cup
2023
2023 Men's Hockey World Cup

Women's Hockey 
1996:
3 Nations Tournament
Women's Hockey Tournament
1997: 6th Indira Gandhi International Gold Cup
1999: 4th Women's Asia Cup

Shooting 
1995:
7th South Asian Federation Games
1st Commonwealth Championship
1997:
VI World Cup
2nd South Asian Shooting Championship
2000, ISSF World Cup
2003: 
ISSF World Cup
Asian Clay Shooting Championship
2010:
Commonwealth Games 2010
2017
ISSF World Cup
2019
ISSF World Cup

Table tennis 
1994: Commonwealth Table Tennis Championships
1996: 13th Asia Cup Table Tennis Tournament
1997:
VIth Asian Junior Table Tennis Championship
14th Asian Cup Table Tennis Tournament
1999: VII Asian Junior Table Tennis Championship
2000: 15th Asia Cup Table Tennis Tournament
2001: 15th Commonwealth Table Tennis Championship

Wrestling 
1992: The 7th Asian Senior Free Style Wrestling Championship
1997:
The Commonwealth Wrestling Championship
The 11th World Cadet Free Style Wrestling Championship
The 3rd Asian Junior Free Style, Greco Roman Style & Female Free Style Wrestling Championship

Running Motivation 

 2018 Running Motivation Yoga at Team Athletics are launching out a very innovate and fun loving creative way of Running and Fitness workout to cater to both girls and boys, between the age group of 5yrs to 18yrs.

See also
 Sport in India
 India at the Olympic

References

Events
Sports 
Sport in India